Sir Patrick John Rushton Sergeant (born 17 March 1924) is a British investor and businessman who is known as the founder of Euromoney Institutional Investor.

He is father of British artist Emma Sergeant.

In 2018, he announced his retirement from his job as executive of Euromoney.

References

Living people
1924 births
British investors
Knights Bachelor